Ausmac is an unincorporated community in Decatur County, in the U.S. state of Georgia.

History
The name "Ausmac" is an amalgamation of Ausley and McCaskill, two businessmen in the local turpentine industry.

References

Unincorporated communities in Decatur County, Georgia
Unincorporated communities in Georgia (U.S. state)